Salvacion Ang Zaldivar-Perez, popularly known as "Inday Sally" Perez, was the Governor of the Philippine province of Antique from 2001 to 2010.

Sally Perez was born to Calixto O. Zaldivar (1904-1979), former Supreme Court Justice from 1964 to 1974 and Elena T. Ang in Pandan, Antique, Philippines.

Life
Perez has been governor since 2001. Prior to being elected governor she was Undersecretary of the President for Liaison with the Senate. Governor Sally Perez is a BS Foreign Service (1957) and A.B. Political Science (1958) graduate of the University of the Philippines Diliman. She pursued post-graduate studies at the Asian Institute of Management where she underwent a Management Course. She started off as an executive secretary at the Insular Life Assurance Co., then moved to the Ayala Museum as Administrator. After these private sector engagements, she worked in various capacities as a management staff at the Supreme Court, U.P. and the Office of Senator Edgardo Angara. She joined the Presidential Legislative Liaison Office as Undersecretary in 1998. In 2001, she was elected Governor of Antique Province.

In 2010 she ran for congress, but was defeated by Paolo Everardo, son of Exequiel Javier who became governor.

She chaired the Antique Development Foundation and was a founding trustee of the Evelio B. Javier Foundation (EBJF).

References

Karay-a people
People from Antique (province)
Governors of Antique (province)
Nationalist People's Coalition politicians
Central Philippine University alumni
Central Philippine University people
Asian Institute of Management alumni
Living people
1937 births
Members of the Philippine Independent Church